Claudio Águila (born 29 January 1961) is an Argentine rower. He competed in the men's coxless pair event at the 1988 Summer Olympics.

References

External links

1961 births
Living people
Argentine male rowers
Olympic rowers of Argentina
Rowers at the 1988 Summer Olympics
Place of birth missing (living people)
Pan American Games medalists in rowing
Pan American Games bronze medalists for Argentina
Rowers at the 1987 Pan American Games